Christos Aravidis (Greek: Χρήστος Αραβίδης; born 13 March 1987) is a Greek professional footballer who plays as a forward for Super League 2 club Apollon Pontus.

Early life 
It was at the age of 7,5 when Christos Aravidis first visited the youth academies of AEK. "In the beginning was just fun after a game became a passion," he recalls, when his father and ex-football player unknowingly motivated his son to deal with football. "My father was a footballer and through him I loved football."

Club career

Akratitos
His steps in football seemed always carefully and selectively. After playing in the Football League for Akratitos, he made his debut in the Superleague Greece with the club at the age of 18,5 against AEK. He scored his first goal in the major league in a match against OFI and he was constantly selected in the Greece U-21 team.

Panionios
He signed a three-year contract with Panionios. Ewald Lienen, the new coach of Panionios was presented a few days ago, and the 19 years' old had to fight to find time in the first major challenge of his career. He succeeded beyond any expectation. Became a member of the starting XI and had a striking appearance in Thessaloniki against Aris Thessaloniki with one goal and assist, and ended his first season in the club having 30 appearances and two goals, but after December he gradually lost his position in the team. The scene was similar the next season besides the 26 appearances and three goals.

Loan to Ethnikos Asteras
Aravidis joined Ethnikos Asteras on loan until the end of the 2008–2009 season on summer of 2008. In April 2009 he filed an appeal against the Ethnikos Asteras, as he played almost entirely unpaid and at the end of the season being released from Panionios, will search the new challenge in his career.

Aris
Aris offered him the opportunity to make a step further, by signing a three year contract. But in Aris neither Mazinho in the beginning, nor Héctor Cúper trusted him and Aravidis succeeded to make only 13 appearances with the club, in almost two years. "The fact is that I did not get the opportunities I deserve. Prior to Aris I had a good football path, which I will try to keep it. This is football and there is no problem. Not always all come as you want." In August 2012 he filed an appeal against the Aris Thessaloniki as he played almost entirely unpaid. asking for the subtraction of two points due to the debt to him.

Doxa Drama
Doxa Drama was the next step in his career. In October 2012 he filed his third appeal (after Ethnikos Asteras and Aris) against the Doxa Drama as there was a private agreement for bonus participations and rentals that never received.

Return to Panionios
In the 2012–13 season became the club's top scorer with 8 goals, contributing to the rise to Super League. Eventually over the years he made 112 appearances (24 goals, 8 assists) with Panionios.

AEK Athens
On 31 January 2014, besides the rumours for PAOK and Panathinaikos, Aravidis decided to play for AEK in Football League at the end of 2013-14 season by signing a three years' contract, when the team was in Football League and since then is a first team option. Aravidis at the end of 2014-15 season, in the few minutes that he played against Alimos, typically secured the lead in the list of scorers of the Southern Group of the Football League, with 13 goals. On 22 August 2015, in a 3–0 home game against Platanias scored his first goal in Greek Super League with AEK.

"Fans will be satisfied if we win the championship. We want the best possible result. If we continue to work hard we'll manage something. Our targets are the Greek Cup and the championship. AEK Athens is a huge club and we returned where we belong to. The match against PAOK is a big game that all fans should enjoy it. We'll try for the best. It's always nice to play with full stands" Aravidis said. On 23 September 2015, he opened the score in an away derby game against PAOK, but his club could not avoid the defeat. Christos Aravidis is set to become the next AEK player to sign a new deal at the club. AEK are set to offer Christos Aravidis a new deal. as are very pleased with Aravidis's displays, with the current one expiring in 2017.

On 20 December 2016, in a home Super League game against PAS Giannina was then sent off in the 10th minute of the game after headbutting Thodoris Berios in the chest. On 12 March 2017 he scored the last goal of AEK in the 3–0 home "double-headed eagle" derby against PAOK. On 6 April 2017 he scored the second goal in his club effort to win a place in season playoffs sealing a 2–0 away win against Platanias F.C.
On 7 June 2017, AEK officially announced that the contract of international striker will be solved. Aravidis had 96 appearances (34 goals, 9 assists) in all competitions with the club.

OFI
On 7 August 2018, Aravidis, after a year without a club, completed a free transfer move to Greek Super League side OFI on a year contract for an undisclosed fee. On 30 October 2018, Aravidis scored after a long period (572 days to be exact) a hat-trick against Niki Volos in a 3–0 home Greek Cup game.

Asteras Tripolis
On 4 February 2019, after six months with OFI, Aravidis signed a six months contract with Asteras Tripolis for an undisclosed fee. On 17 February 2019, he scored his first goal with the club in a 4–1 home Greek Cup win against Ergotelis.

Yverdon
On 29 July 2019 he signed a one-year contract with third-tier Swiss club Yverdon.
The 32-year-old forward was absolutely crucial for the club, after scoring six goals in 15 games and helping the Swiss team get a great distance in its effort to gain the promotion. For this reason, the management of Yverdon decided to terminate the contract with the experienced striker in order to save the rest of his contract, and the Greek international received a good amount of compensation as he had a contract until the summer of 2021.

Lamia
On 14 February 2020 he signed a contract with Super League 1 club Lamia, until the end of the 2019–20 season. On 22 February 2020, he scored a brace in his debut in a 2–2 home draw game against Aris.

Panachaiki 
On 17 August 2020 he signed a contract with Super League 2 club Panachaiki F.C.

International career 
Aravidis has a plural international career in youth Greece squads. On 4 September 2015 he made his debut for Greece in a home game for UEFA against Finland in Piraeus. On 8 October 2015 in just his 3rd cap, he scored his first ever goal for Greece by scoring their only goal in a 3–1 away defeat to Northern Ireland in a UEFA Euro 2016 qualifying match in Belfast.

International goals

Honours
AEK Athens
Greek Cup: 2015–16
Football League: 2014–15
Levadiakos
Super League 2: 2021–22

References

External links
Guardian's Stats Centre

1987 births
Living people
Greek expatriate footballers
Greece youth international footballers
Greece under-21 international footballers
Greece international footballers
Super League Greece players
Football League (Greece) players
Delta Ethniki players
Swiss Promotion League players
Super League Greece 2 players
A.P.O. Akratitos Ano Liosia players
Panionios F.C. players
Ethnikos Asteras F.C. players
Aris Thessaloniki F.C. players
Doxa Drama F.C. players
AEK Athens F.C. players
OFI Crete F.C. players
Asteras Tripolis F.C. players
Yverdon-Sport FC players
PAS Lamia 1964 players
Panachaiki F.C. players
Levadiakos F.C. players
Apollon Pontou FC players
Greek expatriate sportspeople in Switzerland
Expatriate footballers in Switzerland
Association football forwards
Footballers from Athens
Greek footballers